Dienaba Sy (born 27 June 1995) is a French-Senegalese handball player for OGC Nice Côte d'Azur Handball and the Senegalese national team. 

She competed at the 2019 World Women's Handball Championship in Japan.

References

External links

1995 births
Living people
Senegalese female handball players
People from Montivilliers
Sportspeople from Seine-Maritime
Black French sportspeople
French sportspeople of Senegalese descent
French female handball players